The 2022–23 winter transfer window for Iranian football transfers opened on 7 January and closed at midnight on 26 January. Additionally, players without a club could join at any time. This list includes transfers featuring at least one Iran Football League club which were completed after the end of the summer 2022 transfer window on 31 August 2022 and before the end of the 2022–23 winter window.

Persian Gulf Pro League

Aluminium

In:

Out:

Esteghlal

In:

Out:

Foolad

In:

Out:

Gol Gohar

In:

Out:

Havadar

In:

Out:

Malavan

In:

Out:

Mes Kerman

In:

Out:

Mes Rafsanjan

In:

Out:

Naft Masjed-Soleyman

In:

Out:

Nassaji

In:

Out:

Paykan

In:

Out:

Persepolis

In:

Out:

Sanat Naft

In:

Out:

Sepahan

In:

Out:

Tractor

In:

Out:

Zob Ahan

In:

Out:

Notes and references

Football transfers winter 2022–23
2022-23
Transfers